The 2017 Men's South American Volleyball Championship was the 32nd edition of the Men's South American Volleyball Championship, organised by South America's governing volleyball body, the Confederación Sudamericana de Voleibol (CSV). The tournament was held in Santiago and Temuco, Chile from 7 to 11 August 2017. The champions qualified for the 2018 FIVB Volleyball Men's World Championship.

Pools composition

Squads

Venues
 Centro Nacional de Entrenamiento Olímpico, Santiago, Chile – Pool B and Final four
 Gimnasio Olímpico Regional UFRO, Temuco, Chile – Pool A and 5th–8th places

Pool standing procedure
 Number of matches won
 Match points
 Sets ratio
 Points ratio
 If the tie continues as per the point ratio between two teams, the priority will be given to the team which won the last match between them. When the tie in points ratio is between three or more teams, a new classification of these teams in the terms of points 1, 2 and 3 will be made taking into consideration only the matches in which they were opposed to each other.

Match won 3–0 or 3–1: 3 match points for the winner, 0 match points for the loser
Match won 3–2: 2 match points for the winner, 1 match point for the loser

Preliminary round
All times are Chile Standard Time (UTC−04:00).

Pool A

|}

|}

Pool B

|}

|}

Final round
All times are Chile Standard Time (UTC−04:00).

5th–8th places

5th–8th semifinals

|}

7th place match

|}

5th place match

|}

Final four

Semifinals

|}

3rd place match

|}

Final

|}

Final standing

{| class="wikitable" style="text-align:center"
|-
!width=40|Rank
!width=180|Team
|- bgcolor=#ccffcc
|
|style="text-align:left"|
|- bgcolor=#dfefff
|
|style="text-align:left"|
|- bgcolor=#87ceeb
|
|style="text-align:left"|
|- bgcolor=#dfefff
|4
|style="text-align:left"|
|-
|5
|style="text-align:left"|
|-
|6
|style="text-align:left"|
|-
|7
|style="text-align:left"|
|-
|8
|style="text-align:left"|
|}

Awards

Most Valuable Player
 Maurício Borges Silva
Best Setter
 Bruno Rezende
Best Outside Spikers
 Ricardo Lucarelli
 Vicente Parraguirre

Best Middle Blockers
 José Verdi
 Sebastián Solé
Best Opposite Spiker
 Wallace de Souza
Best Libero
 Héctor Mata

References

See also

South American Women's Volleyball Championship
Men's U23 South American Volleyball Championship
Men's Junior South American Volleyball Championship
Boys' Youth South American Volleyball Championship
Boys' U17 South American Volleyball Championship
Volleyball at the Pan American Games
Men's Pan-American Volleyball Cup
Women's Pan-American Volleyball Cup

External links
Official website

Men's South American Volleyball Championships
South American Volleyball Championship
2017 in Chilean sport
Sport in Santiago
Temuco
International volleyball competitions hosted by Chile
2017 in South American sport
August 2017 sports events in South America